Yevgeny Palchikov (born 12 October 1968) is a Russian track and field athlete who specialised in shot put. He competed in the men's shot put at the 1996 Summer Olympics.

References

1968 births
Living people
Place of birth missing (living people)
Russian male shot putters
Olympic male shot putters
Olympic athletes of Russia
Athletes (track and field) at the 1996 Summer Olympics
World Athletics Championships athletes for Russia
Russian Athletics Championships winners
20th-century Russian people